Portslade railway station (in full, Portslade & West Hove station) is a railway station serving the town of Portslade-by-Sea in East Sussex, England, but located on the western fringes of the village of Aldrington (a part commonly known as 'West Hove'). It is  down the line from Brighton.

Services 
Off-peak, all services at Portslade are operated by Southern using  EMUs.

The typical off-peak service in trains per hour is:
 2 tph to  via 
 2 tph to 
 1 tph to 
 1 tph to 

During the peak hours, the station is served by a small number of direct trains between Brighton and Littlehampton.

Future developments 
The Thameslink Programme contains proposals to extend the Thameslink network to various additional routes in southern England; one of these would be the section of the West Coastway line between Hove and Littlehampton, with services running via the Cliftonville Curve from the Brighton Main Line. This will see services that currently terminate at London Bridge continuing through Central London and north wards via the Midland Main Line or East Coast Main Line to destinations such as Luton or Cambridge. This however is not imminent, a Department for Transport whitepaper states only that "the Thameslink Programme will be completed by the end of 2015" and that "interim outputs will be delivered by the end of 2011".

Gallery

See also
Grade II listed buildings in Brighton and Hove: P–R

References

External links 

Railway stations in Brighton and Hove
DfT Category D stations
Former London, Brighton and South Coast Railway stations
Railway stations in Great Britain opened in 1840
Railway stations in Great Britain closed in 1847
Railway stations in Great Britain opened in 1857
Railway stations served by Govia Thameslink Railway
Grade II listed buildings in Brighton and Hove
Grade II listed railway stations
1857 establishments in England